This is a list of episodes of Chopped Sweets, a dessert-themed spin-off of the television series Chopped.

Episodes

Season 1 (2019–20)

Season 2 (2020)

Season 3 (2021)

References 

 

Lists of food television series episodes
Lists of American reality television series episodes